Mariano Arini (born 17 January 1987) is an Italian footballer who plays as a central midfielder for  club Pergolettese.

Club career
Born in Naples, Arini began his youth career with hometown's Napoli, and after the club's bankruptcy he moved to Scotland, joining Rangers. In January 2005 he returned to Italy, signing with Roma.

Arini made his senior debuts with Aversa Normanna in Serie D, and moved to Andria BAT in July 2011.

On 10 January 2013 Arini joined Avellino, taking part of the squad who won the 2012–13 Lega Pro Prima Divisione.

On 24 August Arini made his Serie B debut, starting in a 2–1 home success over Novara; his first goal came on 21 September, in a 1–1 home draw against Varese.

On 8 July 2021 he moved to Pergolettese.

References

External links
 
 

1987 births
Living people
Footballers from Naples
Italian footballers
Association football midfielders
Serie B players
Serie C players
Serie D players
S.F. Aversa Normanna players
S.S. Fidelis Andria 1928 players
U.S. Avellino 1912 players
S.P.A.L. players
U.S. Cremonese players
S.S. Arezzo players
U.S. Pergolettese 1932 players